Brachychiton diversifolius, commonly known as the northern kurrajong, is a small tree of the genus Brachychiton found in northern Australia. It was originally classified in the family Sterculiaceae, which is now within Malvaceae.

Notes

References

diversifolius
Flora of Queensland
Rosids of Western Australia
Malvales of Australia
Trees of Australia
Ornamental trees
Drought-tolerant trees
Plants described in 1844